This is a list of notable individuals born in Spain of Lebanese ancestry or people of Lebanese and Spanish dual nationality who live or lived in Spain.

Musicians
 Chenoa, singer with Lebanese maternal grandmother

Politicians
 José María Benegas, Lebanese-Jewish politician

Sports
 Noel Jammal, European F3 Open Championship driver
 Miguel Layún, Mexican footballer with dual Spanish citizenship is of Lebanese descent
 Roberto Merhi, Spanish racing driver of Lebanese-Brazilian origin

Translators
 Miguel Casiri, Arabic–Latin translator and Arabic–Spanish translator

Visual Artists
 Douglas Abdell, Sculptor

See also
Lebanese people in Spain
List of Lebanese people
List of Lebanese people (Diaspora)

References

Spain
Lebanese
 
Lebanese